Lesnoye is a rural locality (a selo) in Limansky District, Astrakhan Oblast, Russia. The population was 2,115 as of 2010. There are 12 streets.

Geography 
Lesnoye is located 25 km east of Liman (the district's administrative centre) by road. Olya is the nearest rural locality.

References 

Rural localities in Limansky District